The 2008–09 Orlando Magic season was the 20th season of the franchise in the National Basketball Association (NBA). Led by 23-year-old center Dwight Howard, the team finished the regular season with a 59–23 record, the most wins since the 1995–96 season. The Magic would go on to defeat the Philadelphia 76ers in six games in the First Round, highlighted by forward Hedo Türkoğlu's game winner in game four of the first round of the playoffs, then defeated the defending NBA champion Boston Celtics in a tough, hard-fought seven-game series in the semi-finals, and finally, defeated the top-seeded Cleveland Cavaliers in six games in the conference finals, thanks to all-star defensive player of the year center Dwight Howard's 40 points and 10 rebounds in Game 6, to advance to the NBA Finals for the first time since 1995, only to lose to the Los Angeles Lakers in five games.

Following the season, Türkoğlu was traded to the Toronto Raptors in a three-team deal and Rafer Alston, Tony Battie and Courtney Lee were all dealt to the New Jersey Nets. It was also Tyronn Lue’s last season as an NBA player, as 6 years later, he would return to the NBA, as head coach of the Cleveland Cavaliers.

Key dates
June 26: The 2008 NBA draft took place in New York City.
July 1: The free agency period started.
October 29: The Magic opened the season with a game against the Atlanta Hawks.
December 12: Because of a sore left knee, Dwight Howard missed the first game of his professional career, ending a streak of 351 consecutive games played in.
January 13: The Magic scored an NBA record 23 three-pointers against the Sacramento Kings. Nine of the twelve Magic players who played that night scored at least one three pointer: Jameer Nelson (5), JJ Redick (4), Keith Bogans (4), Hedo Türkoğlu (3), Rashard Lewis (3), Courtney Lee (1), Anthony Johnson (1), Brian Cook (1), and Jeremy Richardson (1).
February 2: Jameer Nelson left a game after dislocating his right shoulder. One day later, it was announced that he suffered a torn labrum, and would require surgery to repair it, meaning he would likely miss the rest of the season. A few days prior to the injury, Nelson had been named as a reserve in the All-Star Game.
February 19: As part of a three-way trade, the Magic acquired Rafer Alston from the Houston Rockets.
February 25: The Magic were assured a winning season after defeating the New York Knicks.
March 11: The Magic clinched a playoff spot with a win over the Chicago Bulls.
March 25: After beating the Boston Celtics, the Magic clinched their second consecutive division championship. With the win, they were also guaranteed of finishing the regular season with more wins than the previous season.
April 15: The regular season ended, with the Magic finishing one win shy of matching a franchise record.
April 21: Dwight Howard won the NBA Defensive Player of the Year Award, becoming the youngest player to win the award as well as the first player of the Magic to do so.
April 28: Rookie Courtney Lee was accidentally hit in the face by Dwight Howard during Game 5 of the Magic's first round playoff series. The following day it was announced he would miss Game 6, suffering a fractured sinus.
April 29: Dwight Howard was suspended for one game by the NBA for an incident in which Howard elbowed a Philadelphia 76ers player in the face the previous night in Game 5 of the Magic's first round playoff series.
April 30: The Magic advanced to the second round of the NBA playoffs after defeating the Philadelphia 76ers in 6 games.
May 17: In a Game 7 on the road, the Magic advanced to their first Eastern Conference Finals appearance since 1996 after defeating the defending champion Boston Celtics.
May 30: The Magic defeated the Cleveland Cavaliers 4–2 to advance to the 2009 NBA Finals and made their first appearance since 1995.
June 9: The Magic earned their first NBA Finals game victory in franchise history. They beat the Los Angeles Lakers in Game 3 at Amway Arena by a score of 108–104. The Magic shot an NBA Finals single-game record 75% in the first half, and a record 62.5% for the entire game. The Magic had lost their first six NBA Finals games (four in 1995 and two in 2009).
June 14: The Magic's season ended, having lost the NBA Finals in five games to the Lakers.

Offseason

Draft picks

Roster

Regular season
The first half of the 2008–09 season went very well for the Magic. After 41 games, the Magic were 33–8, leading the Southeast Division, as well as having one of the top four records in the league. On January 13, 2009, they scored an NBA record 23 three-pointers against the Sacramento Kings. Nine of the twelve Magic players who played that night scored at least one three pointer. At the start of February, Jameer Nelson, their all-star starting point guard, went down with a shoulder injury which caused him to miss the remainder of the season. The Magic then began a stretch where they did not win or lose consecutive games for almost the entire month. The Magic did make a deal at the trade deadline with the Houston Rockets for Rafer Alston. Still having to deal with the absence of Nelson though, Orlando managed to maintain one of the top records in the league, secured a second straight winning season, and clinched a playoff berth in mid-March. The Magic defeated the defending champion Boston Celtics to capture their second consecutive division championship, and on the same night assured themselves of winning more games than the previous season. Finishing the regular season with a 59–23 record, it was the most games the team had won in a season since the 1995–96 season in which they had 60 wins.

Standings

Record vs. opponents

Game log

|- bgcolor="#ffcccc"
| 1
| October 29
| Atlanta
| 
| Dwight Howard (22)
| Dwight Howard (15)
| Anthony Johnson (3)
| Amway Arena17,461
| 0–1
|- bgcolor="#ffcccc"
| 2
| October 31
| @ Memphis
| 
| Rashard Lewis (23)
| Dwight Howard (14)
| Hedo Türkoğlu (7)
| FedExForum16,139
| 0–2

|- bgcolor="#bbffbb"
| 3
| November 1
| Sacramento
| 
| Dwight Howard (29)
| Dwight Howard (14)
| Rashard Lewis (6)
| Amway Arena16,704
| 1–2
|- bgcolor="#bbffbb"
| 4
| November 3
| Chicago
| 
| Dwight Howard (22)
| Dwight Howard (15)
| Hedo Türkoğlu (7)
| Amway Arena15,606
| 2–2
|- bgcolor="#bbffbb"
| 5
| November 6
| Philadelphia
| 
| Rashard Lewis, Hedo Türkoğlu (20)
| Rashard Lewis, Hedo Türkoğlu, Dwight Howard (8)
| Jameer Nelson (9)
| Amway Arena16,407
| 3–2
|- bgcolor="#bbffbb"
| 6
| November 8
| Washington
| 
| Dwight Howard (31)
| Dwight Howard (16)
| Jameer Nelson (6)
| Amway Arena16,911
| 4–2
|- bgcolor="#ffcccc"
| 7
| November 10
| Portland
| 
| Hedo Türkoğlu (35)
| Dwight Howard (19)
| Jameer Nelson (7)
| Amway Arena14,210
| 4–3
|- bgcolor="#bbffbb"
| 8
| November 12
| @ Oklahoma City
| 
| Dwight Howard (30)
| Dwight Howard (19)
| Hedo Türkoğlu (7)
| Ford Center18,185
| 5–3
|- bgcolor="#bbffbb"
| 9
| November 14
| @ Dallas
| 
| Rashard Lewis (23)
| Dwight Howard (13)
| Anthony Johnson (6)
| American Airlines Center20,085
| 6–3
|- bgcolor="#bbffbb"
| 10
| November 16
| @ Charlotte
| 
| Hedo Türkoğlu (20)
| Tony Battie, Dwight Howard (7)
| Hedo Türkoğlu (4)
| Time Warner Cable Arena12,639
| 7–3
|- bgcolor="#bbffbb"
| 11
| November 18
| Toronto
| 
| Rashard Lewis, Hedo Türkoğlu, Jameer Nelson (22)
| Dwight Howard (9)
| Hedo Türkoğlu (7)
| Amway Arena16,353
| 8–3
|- bgcolor="#bbffbb"
| 12
| November 21
| @ Indiana
| 
| Dwight Howard (24)
| Dwight Howard (17)
| Jameer Nelson (9)
| Conseco Fieldhouse14,699
| 9–3
|- bgcolor="#ffcccc"
| 13
| November 22
| Houston
| 
| Jameer Nelson (21)
| Dwight Howard (9)
| Jameer Nelson (6)
| Amway Arena17,461
| 9–4
|- bgcolor="#bbffbb"
| 14
| November 24
| Milwaukee
| 
| Dwight Howard (24)
| Dwight Howard (13)
| Jameer Nelson (6)
| Amway Arena16,245
| 10–4
|- bgcolor="#bbffbb"
| 15
| November 26
| @ Philadelphia
| 
| Dwight Howard (21)
| Dwight Howard (14)
| Hedo Türkoğlu (7)
| Wachovia Center14,985
| 11–4
|- bgcolor="#bbffbb"
| 16
| November 27
| @ Washington
| 
| Dwight Howard (26)
| Dwight Howard (14)
| Anthony Johnson (12)
| Verizon Center13,295
| 12–4
|- bgcolor="#bbffbb"
| 17
| November 29
| Indiana
| 
| Dwight Howard (32)
| Dwight Howard (21)
| Anthony Johnson, JJ Redick (4)
| Amway Arena17,172
| 13–4

|- bgcolor="#ffcccc"
| 18
| December 1
| @ Boston
| 
| Rashard Lewis (30)
| Dwight Howard (15)
| Hedo Türkoğlu, Anthony Johnson (4)
| TD Banknorth Garden18,624
| 13–5
|- bgcolor="#bbffbb"
| 19
| December 3
| Minnesota
| 
| Rashard Lewis, Dwight Howard (23)
| Dwight Howard (14)
| Rashard Lewis (5)
| Amway Arena15,705
| 14–5
|- bgcolor="#bbffbb"
| 20
| December 5
| Oklahoma City
| 
| Dwight Howard (21)
| Dwight Howard (23)
| Jameer Nelson, Hedo Türkoğlu (7)
| Amway Arena16,812
| 15–5
|- bgcolor="#bbffbb"
| 21
| December 8
| @ L.A. Clippers
| 
| Dwight Howard (23)
| Dwight Howard (22)
| Hedo Türkoğlu (6)
| Staples Center15,222
| 16–5
|- bgcolor="#bbffbb"
| 22
| December 9
| @ Portland
| 
| Rashard Lewis (27)
| Rashard Lewis (9)
| Jameer Nelson (6)
| Rose Garden20,642
| 17–5
|- bgcolor="#ffcccc"
| 23
| December 12
| @ Phoenix
| 
| Dwight Howard (19)
| Rashard Lewis (8)
| Jameer Nelson, Anthony Johnson (6)
| US Airways Center18,422
| 17–6
|- bgcolor="#bbffbb"
| 24
| December 13
| @ Utah
| 
| Rashard Lewis (27)
| Rashard Lewis (9)
| Jameer Nelson (6)
| EnergySolutions Arena19,911
| 18–6
|- bgcolor="#bbffbb"
| 25
| December 15
| @ Golden State
| 
| Jameer Nelson (32)
| Marcin Gortat (13)
| Hedo Türkoğlu (8)
| Oracle Arena18,844
| 19–6
|- bgcolor="#bbffbb"
| 26
| December 18
| San Antonio
| 
| Jameer Nelson (24)
| Dwight Howard (13)
| Jameer Nelson (7)
| Amway Arena17,461
| 20–6
|- bgcolor="#bbffbb"
| 27
| December 20
| L.A. Lakers
| 
| Jameer Nelson (27)
| Dwight Howard (12)
| Hedo Türkoğlu (7)
| Amway Arena17,461
| 21–6
|- bgcolor="#bbffbb"
| 28
| December 22
| Golden State
| 
| Jameer Nelson (22)
| Dwight Howard (11)
| Jameer Nelson, Hedo Türkoğlu (7)
| Amway Arena17,461
| 22–6
|- bgcolor="#bbffbb"
| 29
| December 25
| New Orleans
| 
| Hedo Türkoğlu (20)
| Dwight Howard (15)
| Hedo Türkoğlu (5)
| Amway Arena17,461
| 23–6
|- bgcolor="#bbffbb"
| 30
| December 27
| @ Minnesota
| 
| Hedo Türkoğlu (26)
| Hedo Türkoğlu, Rashard Lewis (7)
| Jameer Nelson (8)
| Target Center17,003
| 24–6
|- bgcolor="#ffcccc"
| 31
| December 29
| @ Detroit
| 
| Rashard Lewis (23)
| Dwight Howard (18)
| Hedo Türkoğlu (8)
| The Palace of Auburn Hills22,076
| 24–7
|- bgcolor="#bbffbb"
| 32
| December 31
| @ Chicago
| 
| Rashard Lewis (21)
| Dwight Howard (14)
| Jameer Nelson (5)
| United Center21,861
| 25–7

|- bgcolor="#bbffbb"
| 33
| January 2
| Miami
| 
| Rashard Lewis (17)
| Dwight Howard (15)
| Jameer Nelson, Hedo Türkoğlu (5)
| Amway Arena17,461
| 26–7
|- bgcolor="#ffcccc"
| 34
| January 4
| @ Toronto
| 
| Dwight Howard (39)
| Dwight Howard (8)
| Rashard Lewis (9)
| Air Canada Centre19,322
| 26–8
|- bgcolor="#bbffbb"
| 35
| January 6
| Washington
| 
| Hedo Türkoğlu (22)
| Dwight Howard (16)
| Hedo Türkoğlu (7)
| Amway Arena16,011
| 27–8
|- bgcolor="#bbffbb"
| 36
| January 7
| @ Atlanta
| 
| Dwight Howard (23)
| Dwight Howard (19)
| Hedo Türkoğlu (8)
| Philips Arena13,748
| 28–8
|- bgcolor="#bbffbb"
| 37
| January 9
| Atlanta
| 
| Hedo Türkoğlu (21)
| Marcin Gortat (11)
| Jameer Nelson (9)
| Amway Arena17,461
| 29–8
|- bgcolor="#bbffbb"
| 38
| January 11
| @ San Antonio
| 
| Dwight Howard (24)
| Dwight Howard (14)
| Jameer Nelson, Hedo Türkoğlu (5)
| AT&T Center18,216
| 30–8
|- bgcolor="#bbffbb"
| 39
| January 13
| @ Sacramento
| 
| Dwight Howard (25)
| Dwight Howard (15)
| Jameer Nelson (11)
| ARCO Arena11,168
| 31–8
|- bgcolor="#bbffbb"
| 40
| January 16
| @ L.A. Lakers
| 
| Jameer Nelson (28)
| Dwight Howard (20)
| Jameer Nelson (8)
| Staples Center18,997
| 32–8
|- bgcolor="#bbffbb"
| 41
| January 17
| @ Denver
| 
| Hedo Türkoğlu (31)
| Dwight Howard (20)
| Hedo Türkoğlu, Jameer Nelson (5)
| Pepsi Center19,749
| 33–8
|- bgcolor="#ffcccc"
| 42
| January 22
| Boston
| 
| Hedo Türkoğlu (22)
| Dwight Howard (11)
| Jameer Nelson (3)
| Amway Arena17,461
| 33–9
|- bgcolor="#ffcccc"
| 43
| January 24
| @ Miami
| 
| Dwight Howard (22)
| Dwight Howard (10)
| Jameer Nelson (7)
| American Airlines Arena19,600
| 33–10
|- bgcolor="#bbffbb"
| 44
| January 27
| Indiana
| 
| Mickaël Piétrus (27)
| Mickaël Piétrus, Dwight Howard (10)
| Jameer Nelson, Hedo Türkoğlu (8)
| Amway Arena17,461
| 34–10
|- bgcolor="#bbffbb"
| 45
| January 29
| Cleveland
| 
| Dwight Howard (22)
| Dwight Howard (18)
| Rashard Lewis (5)
| Amway Arena17,461
| 35–10

|- bgcolor="#bbffbb"
| 46
| February 1
| @ Toronto
| 
| Dwight Howard (29)
| Dwight Howard (14)
| Jameer Nelson (10)
| Air Canada Centre19,800
| 36–10
|- bgcolor="#ffcccc"
| 47
| February 2
| Dallas
| 
| Dwight Howard (35)
| Dwight Howard (11)
| Hedo Türkoğlu (4)
| Amway Arena16,551
| 36–11
|- bgcolor="#bbffbb"
| 48
| February 4
| L.A. Clippers
| 
| Anthony Johnson (25)
| Dwight Howard (15)
| Hedo Türkoğlu (6)
| Amway Arena16,101
| 37–11
|- bgcolor="#ffcccc"
| 49
| February 6
| @ Indiana
| 
| Dwight Howard (21)
| Dwight Howard (20)
| Hedo Türkoğlu (11)
| Conseco Fieldhouse13,559
| 37–12
|- bgcolor="#bbffbb"
| 50
| February 8
| New Jersey
| 
| Dwight Howard (30)
| Dwight Howard (16)
| Hedo Türkoğlu (8)
| Amway Arena16,533
| 38–12
|- bgcolor="#ffcccc"
| 51
| February 11
| Denver
| 
| Dwight Howard (16)
| Dwight Howard (15)
| Hedo Türkoğlu (5)
| Amway Arena17,461
| 38–13
|- bgcolor="#bbffbb"
| 52
| February 17
| Charlotte
| 
| Dwight Howard (45)
| Dwight Howard (19)
| Hedo Türkoğlu (7)
| Amway Arena17,461
| 39–13
|- bgcolor="#ffcccc"
| 53
| February 18
| @ New Orleans
| 
| Rashard Lewis (17)
| Marcin Gortat, Dwight Howard (8)
| Rashard Lewis (8)
| New Orleans Arena16,651
| 39–14
|- bgcolor="#bbffbb"
| 54
| February 20
| @ Charlotte
| 
| Hedo Türkoğlu (24)
| Dwight Howard (16)
| Rafer Alston (8)
| Time Warner Cable Arena19,244
| 40–14
|- bgcolor="#bbffbb"
| 55
| February 22
| Miami
| 
| Dwight Howard (32)
| Dwight Howard (17)
| Rafer Alston (9)
| Amway Arena17,461
| 41–14
|- bgcolor="#ffcccc"
| 56
| February 24
| @ Chicago
| 
| Dwight Howard (26)
| Dwight Howard (12)
| Rashard Lewis, Rafer Alston (5)
| United Center21,902
| 41–15
|- bgcolor="#bbffbb"
| 57
| February 25
| @ New York
| 
| Hedo Türkoğlu (33)
| Dwight Howard (21)
| Rashard Lewis (4)
| Madison Square Garden19,763
| 42–15
|- bgcolor="#ffcccc"
| 58
| February 27
| Detroit
| 
| Dwight Howard (21)
| Dwight Howard (13)
| Rafer Alston (6)
| Amway Arena17,461
| 42–16
|- bgcolor="#bbffbb"
| 59
| February 28
| @ Philadelphia
| 
| Rashard Lewis, Hedo Türkoğlu (23)
| Dwight Howard (8)
| Hedo Türkoğlu (7)
| Wachovia Center19,703
| 43–16

|- bgcolor="#bbffbb"
| 60
| March 3
| Phoenix
| 
| Rashard Lewis (29)
| Rashard Lewis (12)
| Hedo Türkoğlu, Rafer Alston (6)
| Amway Arena17,461
| 44–16
|- bgcolor="#bbffbb"
| 61
| March 6
| New Jersey
| 
| Dwight Howard (26)
| Dwight Howard (15)
| Rafer Alston (6)
| Amway Arena17,461
| 45–16
|- bgcolor="#bbffbb"
| 62
| March 8
| @ Boston
| 
| Dwight Howard (18)
| Dwight Howard (15)
| Rafer Alston (8)
| TD Banknorth Garden18,624
| 46–16
|- bgcolor="#ffcccc"
| 63
| March 9
| @ Detroit
| 
| Dwight Howard (27)
| Dwight Howard (14)
| Rafer Alston (5)
| The Palace of Auburn Hills20,039
| 46–17
|- bgcolor="#bbffbb"
| 64
| March 11
| Chicago
| 
| Tony Battie (18)
| Marcin Gortat (15)
| Rafer Alston, Anthony Johnson (6)
| Amway Arena17,461
| 47–17
|- bgcolor="#bbffbb"
| 65
| March 13
| @ Washington
| 
| Mickaël Piétrus (21)
| Dwight Howard (13)
| Dwight Howard (7)
| Verizon Center18,152
| 48–17
|- bgcolor="#bbffbb"
| 66
| March 15
| Utah
| 
| Dwight Howard (28)
| Dwight Howard (20)
| Hedo Türkoğlu (8)
| Amway Arena17,461
| 49–17
|- bgcolor="#ffcccc"
| 67
| March 17
| @ Cleveland
| 
| Rafer Alston (23)
| Dwight Howard (15)
| Hedo Türkoğlu (7)
| Quicken Loans Arena20,562
| 49–18
|- bgcolor="#bbffbb"
| 68
| March 18
| @ Milwaukee
| 
| Dwight Howard (28)
| Dwight Howard (12)
| Dwight Howard, Hedo Türkoğlu (7)
| Bradley Center13,819
| 50–18
|- bgcolor="#bbffbb"
| 69
| March 21
| New York
| 
| Rashard Lewis (27)
| Marcin Gortat (8)
| Hedo Türkoğlu (9)
| Amway Arena17,461
| 51–18
|- bgcolor="#bbffbb"
| 70
| March 23
| @ New York
| 
| Dwight Howard (29)
| Dwight Howard (14)
| Hedo Türkoğlu (3)
| Madison Square Garden19,763
| 52–18
|- bgcolor="#bbffbb"
| 71
| March 25
| Boston
| 
| Dwight Howard (24)
| Dwight Howard (21)
| Rafer Alston (6)
| Amway Arena17,461
| 53–18
|- bgcolor="#bbffbb"
| 72
| March 27
| Milwaukee
| 
| Rashard Lewis (19)
| Marcin Gortat (11)
| Dwight Howard, Rafer Alston (5)
| Amway Arena17,461
| 54–18
|- bgcolor="#bbffbb"
| 73
| March 30
| @ Miami
| 
| Dwight Howard (22)
| Dwight Howard (18)
| Hedo Türkoğlu, Rafer Alston (5)
| American Airlines Arena19,600
| 55–18

|- bgcolor="#ffcccc"
| 74
| April 1
| Toronto
| 
| Dwight Howard (30)
| Dwight Howard (9)
| Hedo Türkoğlu (6)
| Amway Arena17,461
| 55–19
|- bgcolor="#bbffbb"
| 75
| April 3
| Cleveland
| 
| Rashard Lewis (22)
| Dwight Howard (11)
| Rafer Alston (10)
| Amway Arena17,461
| 56–19
|- bgcolor="#bbffbb"
| 76
| April 4
| @ Atlanta
| 
| Dwight Howard (21)
| Dwight Howard (23)
| Dwight Howard (5)
| Philips Arena19,608
| 57–19
|- bgcolor="#ffcccc"
| 77
| April 7
| @ Houston
| 
| Rashard Lewis (22)
| Rashard Lewis (12)
| Rashard Lewis, Hedo Türkoğlu (4)
| Toyota Center18,389
| 57–20
|- bgcolor="#bbffbb"
| 78
| April 8
| Memphis
| 
| Hedo Türkoğlu (20)
| Dwight Howard (13)
| Hedo Türkoğlu (7)
| Amway Arena17,461
| 58–20
|- bgcolor="#ffcccc"
| 79
| April 10
| New York
| 
| Hedo Türkoğlu (24)
| Dwight Howard (14)
| Hedo Türkoğlu, Rafer Alston (5)
| Amway Arena17,461
| 58–21
|- bgcolor="#ffcccc"
| 80
| April 11
| @ New Jersey
| 
| Hedo Türkoğlu (16)
| Dwight Howard (8)
| Rafer Alston (8)
| Izod Center17,123
| 58–22
|- bgcolor="#ffcccc"
| 81
| April 13
| @ Milwaukee
| 
| Courtney Lee (17)
| Marcin Gortat (18)
| Rafer Alston (4)
| Bradley Center14,683
| 58–23
|- bgcolor="#bbffbb"
| 82
| April 15
| Charlotte
| 
| Tony Battie (21)
| Dwight Howard (12)
| Mickaël Piétrus (5)
| Amway Arena17,461
| 59–23

Playoffs
The Magic drew the Philadelphia 76ers in the first round of the playoffs. With the series tied at two wins for each team, Game 5 saw Vivani an incident in the 1st quarter involving Dwight Howard throwing an elbow at 76ers center Samuel Dalembert. Howard was assessed a technical foul but was not ejected from the game. The NBA reviewed the play and suspended Howard for Game 6. A second incident involving an elbow from Dwight Howard happened in Game 5 not long after the elbow to Dalembert. This time however, Magic rookie Courtney Lee was the recipient of the hit from his teammate. Lee left the game and did not return. Suffering a fractured sinus, it was announced that Lee was expected to have surgery and could miss the remainder of the postseason. Neither player's absence would prove costly to Orlando in Game 6, who won the series with a blowout on the road, and Lee returned to action in the next series wearing a protective face mask, such as one worn by Richard Hamilton.

In the Eastern Conference semi-finals, the Magic faced the defending champion Boston Celtics. Facing a 3–2 series deficit, the Magic tied the series with a home game victory in Game 6 and advanced to the Eastern Conference Finals by winning Game 7 on the road, ending Boston's 32–0 undefeated record when leading the series 3–2. Assistant Coach Patrick Ewing had guaranteed a win in Game 7.

Returning to the conference finals for the first time since 1996, the Magic's opponent was the Cleveland Cavaliers, who compiled the league's best regular season record led by the season's MVP, LeBron James. That didn't stop the Magic as they closed the series out at home in Game 6, winning 103–90 as Dwight Howard scored 40 points, a career high for him in a playoff game. The Magic won the series 4–2, the Eastern Conference championship, and the right to face the Los Angeles Lakers in the 2009 NBA Finals.

After dropping the first two games in the series, the Magic finally won their first ever game in the finals in Game 3. With the franchise losing their first six finals games 1995 and 2009 combined, it was the second most games a team had lost in the finals before earning their first win. However, in Game 4 the Magic lost to the Lakers 99–91 in overtime; the Lakers took a 3–1 series lead and won again in Game 5, thus ending the Magic's longest playoff run in team history and ending up 1–8 in the finals.

Game log

|- bgcolor="#ffcccc"
| 1 || April 19 || Philadelphia ||  || Dwight Howard (31) || Dwight Howard (16) || Rafer Alston (5) || Amway Arena17,461 || 0–1
|- bgcolor="#bbffbb"
| 2 || April 22 || Philadelphia ||  || Courtney Lee (24) || Dwight Howard (10) || Rashard Lewis (6) || Amway Arena17,461 || 1–1
|- bgcolor="#ffcccc"
| 3 || April 24 || @ Philadelphia ||  || Dwight Howard (36) || Dwight Howard (11) || Courtney Lee (5) || Wachovia Center16,492 || 1–2
|- bgcolor="#bbffbb"
| 4 || April 26 || @ Philadelphia ||  || Dwight Howard (18) || Dwight Howard (18) || Rafer Alston (5) || Wachovia Center16,464 || 2–2
|- bgcolor="#bbffbb"
| 5 || April 28 || Philadelphia ||  || Howard, Lewis (24) || Dwight Howard (24) || Alston, Türkoğlu (4) ||Amway Arena17,461 || 3–2
|- bgcolor="#bbffbb"
| 6 || April 30 || @ Philadelphia ||  || Rashard Lewis (29) || Marcin Gortat (15) || Rafer Alston (10) || Wachovia Center16,691 || 4–2

|- bgcolor="#bbffbb"
| 1 || May 4 || @ Boston ||  || Rashard Lewis (18) || Dwight Howard (22) || Rafer Alston (7) || TD Banknorth Garden18,624 || 1–0
|- bgcolor="#ffcccc"
| 2 || May 6 || @ Boston ||  ||Lewis, Piétrus (17) || Dwight Howard (12) || Anthony Johnson (7) || TD Banknorth Garden18,624 || 1–1
|- bgcolor="#bbffbb"
| 3 || May 8 || Boston ||  || Rashard Lewis (28) || Dwight Howard (14) || Hedo Türkoğlu (4) || Amway Arena17,461 || 2–1
|- bgcolor="#ffcccc"
| 4 || May 10 || Boston ||  || Dwight Howard (23) || Dwight Howard (17) || JJ Redick (7) || Amway Arena17,461 || 2–2
|- bgcolor="#ffcccc"
| 5 || May 12 || @ Boston ||  || Rashard Lewis (19) || Dwight Howard (17) || Hedo Türkoğlu (7) || TD Banknorth Garden18,624 || 2–3
|- bgcolor="#bbffbb"
| 6 || May 14 || Boston ||  || Dwight Howard (23) || Dwight Howard (22) || Alston, Lewis, Türkoğlu (3) || Amway Arena17,461 || 3–3
|- bgcolor="#bbffbb"
| 7 || May 17 || @ Boston ||  || Hedo Türkoğlu (25) || Dwight Howard (16) || Hedo Türkoğlu (12) || TD Banknorth Garden18,624 || 4–3

|- bgcolor="#bbffbb"
| 1 || May 20 || @ Cleveland ||  || Dwight Howard (30) || Dwight Howard (13) || Hedo Türkoğlu (14) || Quicken Loans Arena20,562 || 1–0
|- bgcolor="#ffcccc"
| 2 || May 22 || @ Cleveland ||  || Rashard Lewis (23) || Dwight Howard (18) || Howard, Johnson, Türkoğlu (4) || Quicken Loans Arena20,562 || 1–1
|- bgcolor="#bbffbb"
| 3 || May 24 || Cleveland ||  || Dwight Howard (24) || Hedo Türkoğlu (10) || Hedo Türkoğlu (7) || Amway Arena17,461 || 2–1
|- bgcolor="#bbffbb"
| 4 || May 26 || Cleveland ||  || Dwight Howard (27) || Dwight Howard (14) || Hedo Türkoğlu (8) || Amway Arena17,461 || 3–1
|- bgcolor="#ffcccc"
| 5 || May 28 || @ Cleveland ||  || Hedo Türkoğlu (29) || Dwight Howard (10) || Rafer Alston (4) || Quicken Loans Arena20,562 || 3–2
|- bgcolor="#bbffbb"
| 6 || May 30 || Cleveland ||  || Dwight Howard (40) || Dwight Howard (14) || Hedo Türkoğlu (5) || Amway Arena17,461 || 4–2

|- bgcolor="#ffcccc"
| 1 || June 4 || @ L.A. Lakers ||  || Mickaël Piétrus (14) || Dwight Howard (15) || Jameer Nelson (4) || Staples Center18,997 || 0–1
|- bgcolor="#ffcccc"
| 2 || June 7 || @ L.A. Lakers ||  || Rashard Lewis (34) || Dwight Howard (16) || Rashard Lewis (7) || Staples Center18,997 || 0–2
|- bgcolor="#bbffbb"
| 3 || June 9 || L.A. Lakers ||  || Howard, Lewis (21) || Dwight Howard (14) || Hedo Türkoğlu (7) || Amway Arena17,461 || 1–2
|- bgcolor="#ffcccc"
| 4 || June 11 || L.A. Lakers ||  || Hedo Türkoğlu (25) || Dwight Howard (21) || Rashard Lewis (4) || Amway Arena17,461 || 1–3
|- bgcolor="#ffcccc"
| 5 || June 14 || L.A. Lakers ||  || Rashard Lewis (18) || Howard, Lewis (10) || Lewis, Nelson (4) || Amway Arena17,461 || 1–4

Player statistics

Season

Playoffs

Awards and records
Dwight Howard – Defensive Player of the Year, All-NBA 1st Team, All-Defensive 1st Team, Rebounding Champion, Blocks Champion, All-Star
Rashard Lewis – All-Star
Jameer Nelson – All-Star

Records
Orlando broke the 3-point record with 23 made 3-pointers on January 13, 2008 in Sacramento.
Rashard Lewis led the league in 3-point field goals.

Transactions

Trades

Free agents

Additions

Subtractions

References

Orlando Magic seasons
Orlando
Eastern Conference (NBA) championship seasons
2008 in sports in Florida
2009 in sports in Florida